Daleville Community Schools is a public school district in Salem Township, Delaware County, Indiana, United States, based in Daleville, Indiana.

Schools
The Daleville Community Schools School District has one elementary school and one junior/senior high school.

Elementary school 
Daleville Elementary School

Junior/Senior high school
Daleville High School

References

External links
Daleville Community Schools
USA News.Education
Great Schools, Inc.

Education in Delaware County, Indiana
School districts in Indiana